Leslie Alan Mutrie (1 April 1951 – 3 October 2017) was an English footballer who played as a striker in The Football League.

Career
Born in Newcastle upon Tyne, Mutrie played for Gateshead, Carlisle United, Blyth Spartans, Hull City, Doncaster Rovers, Colchester United, Hartlepool United and Dudley Welfare between 1977 and 1985.

Honours

Club
Hull City
 Football League Fourth Division Runner-up (1): 1982–83

Individual
 PFA Team of the Year (1): 1982–83

References

1952 births
2017 deaths
Footballers from Newcastle upon Tyne
English footballers
England semi-pro international footballers
Association football forwards
Gateshead F.C. players
Carlisle United F.C. players
Blyth Spartans A.F.C. players
Hull City A.F.C. players
Doncaster Rovers F.C. players
Colchester United F.C. players
Hartlepool United F.C. players
Northern Premier League players
English Football League players
English football managers